Tebe dance is a traditional dance originating from East Nusa Tenggara, Indonesia. Tebe dance is a typical dance of the Belu and Malaka people which symbolizes the intimacy and solidarity between residents. In addition, Tebe dance is also an overflow of joy for success or victory. 

The Tebe dance is performed by men and women holding hands while singing in unison singing poems and rhymes that contain praise, criticism or requests, while stomping their feet according to the rhythm of the song. The Tebe dance ends when all the performers sit cross-legged on a large mat to share a light meal together as a sign to part ways and return to their respective homes.

The Tebe dance, which is one of the cultures of East Nusa Tenggara, is usually performed at night, during traditional weddings or other events. According to historical records, in ancient times it was carried out that the Meo (war soldier) returned from the battlefield carrying the enemy's head, then staked it in the middle and then they surrounded it all night and usually for 3 or 4 days.

Currently, the Tebe Dance is often performed at church events or other joyful events.

Gallery

See also

 Rejang dance
 Yapong dance
 Dance in Indonesia

References

Dances of Indonesia